Ira Brad Matetsky (born 1962) is an American lawyer and Wikipedian.

Matetsky has practiced law since 1987. He has been a partner at Ganfer Shore Leeds & Zauderer, a New York City business litigation and real estate law firm, since 2004, working in both their litigation practice group and their cooperative and condominium housing practice group. Before joining Ganfer & Shore, Matetsky was a litigation attorney at Skadden, Arps, Slate, Meagher & Flom, after which he served as co-general counsel at Goya Foods, Inc. Matetsky is the editor-in-chief of The Journal of In-Chambers Practice and an editor of both the Green Bag Almanac & Reader and the Baker Street Almanac. Matetsky has been cited as a legal expert by media sources including CNBC, Vanity Fair, The Washington Post, and The National Law Journal.

Matetsky has been a guest blogger for Eugene Volokh's blog The Volokh Conspiracy. While working at Ganfer & Shore, Matetsky represented Morris Talansky, filing a suit against the Israeli satellite company ImageSat International on their behalf in 2007. The suit was dismissed the following year.

Matetsky began editing Wikipedia in 2005 under the username Newyorkbrad, correcting a factual error on – recently deceased – William Rehnquist's Wikipedia page. Matetsky served on the English Wikipedia's Arbitration Committee from 2008 to 2014, and rejoined in 2017, making him the Committee's longest-serving member.

As of 2016, Matetsky also serves as the "werowance" (or president) of the Wolfe Pack, an organization of fans of Rex Stout's most famous fictional detective, Nero Wolfe. In 2015, Matetsky edited The Last Drive and Other Stories, a collection of Stout's earliest published work.

References

External links 
Profile at Martindale-Hubbell

1962 births
Living people
Princeton University alumni
Fordham University School of Law alumni
Lawyers from New York City
Litigators
Corporate lawyers
Skadden, Arps, Slate, Meagher & Flom people
American Wikimedians
Wikipedia people